The NBL1 Grand Final is the championship series for the NBL1 and the conclusion of the NBL1 National Finals.

Champions

Legend

NBL1 Women's champions

NBL1 Men's champions

Results by teams

See also

 NBL1
 NBL1 seasons

References

External links

NBL1
NBL1